Brenda Power (born 1962) is an Irish journalist, barrister and a radio and television broadcaster on Raidió Teilifís Éireann (RTÉ) and Newstalk.

Career
Power is a former presenter of Crimecall. Prior to this, she filled in for Marian Finucane and Joe Duffy on their respective radio shows. Power worked as a presenter/reporter on Would You Believe, on RTE 1 TV. She has also featured as a panelist in TV3's Midday Programme and RTE's Cutting Edge panel show.

She also presented her own radio shows, including the phone-in programme Your Call on Newstalk, and had worked for RTÉ since 2000, also presented her own show The Brenda Power Show on RTE Radio 1. During the summer of 2006, Power stood in for George Hook on The Right Hook on Newstalk. She has also worked for The Irish Press group writing The People Column. She wrote for Magill and Image Magazines, and as a columnist with The Sunday Times and the Irish Daily Mail.

In 1996, Power qualified as a barrister, specialising in Common Law. Power also works as a media and public relations consultant.

In 2010 she published, The Noughties: From Glitz to Gloom (Collins), about Ireland from the Celtic Tiger to crash and the Recession.

Views and controversy
Power has been known for her Catholic, conservative and often controversial viewpoints. For instance, she has written that '...all of the seven deadly sins have since been rebranded as lifestyle choices — envy is motivation, lust is polyamory, and sloth is me-time'. She has accused doctors allowing children under 16 access to abortion without their parent's consent of being guilty of assault. Regarding suicide, Power has argued 'failing to voice even the mildest social disapproval of suicide...we may be making it too easy for troubled people to escape themselves and their responsibilities'.

Power has also voiced opposition to LGBT rights. She has opposed same-sex marriage, having campaigned against it in her Times Online column. She is highly critical of LGBT adoption (" I wouldn't like a child to be brought up by two men dressed all day in women's clothes, to be frank"), gay pride ("foolish and anachronistic"), and the Irish gay community, which she describes as "misogynistic". In addition, Power has compared gender dysphoria to eating disorders and other mental illnesses. She has stated her support for the 2020 High Court Ruling in the UK regarding puberty blockers.

In 2015, she was criticised by Traveller advocacy group Pavee Point and the Irish Council for Civil Liberties for a column that accused Travellers of 'beating their own cousins in family rows' and 'torturing and murdering old folk and causing mayhem on school playgrounds'. Despite being interviewed by the Gardaí, the Irish Director of Public Prosecutions declined to pursue legal action, a result Power claimed was a victory for free speech. She went on to compare herself to Charlie Hebdo.

Her views on Muslim immigration to Europe, which Power claims will reduce the freedoms of Western women, drew criticism from a number of prominent members of Ireland's Muslim community, including Dr.Umar Al-Qadri. Additionally she has voiced strong opposition to proposals aimed at accommodating Muslim students in primary and secondary schools

Personal life
Power is the eldest daughter of Patrick and Rose Power of Ballynooney, Mullinavat, Kilkenny. She is separated and has five children.  Brenda won the A.T. Cross Young journalist of the year award in the early 1980s. Power is a graduate of the College of Commerce, Rathmines, with a diploma in journalism. While working as a journalist, Power studied at the King's Inns and was called to the bar in 1996.

References

Living people
Alumni of Dublin Institute of Technology
Alumni of King's Inns
Irish barristers
Irish columnists
Irish women lawyers
LGBT adoption
Newstalk presenters
People from Kilkenny (city)
RTÉ Radio 1 presenters
RTÉ television presenters
Irish women television presenters
Irish women radio presenters
Irish women columnists
1962 births